Titanyen is a village in Haiti, north of the capital, Port-au-Prince and some eight kilometres from Cabaret. It has been described as sparsely populated.  Fields outside the settlement were chosen as the site of mass graves dug for victims of the 2010 Haiti earthquake.

References

By the thousands, Haiti returns dead to the earth
Haiti's Earthquake, 2 years on: Where the living mingle with the dead

Populated places in Haiti
Mass graves